Melinda Rackham is an Australian artist, writer and curator.

Education and early art 
Rackham studied sculpture and performance at the College of Fine Arts in Sydney, graduating in 1989 with the Sculpture and Alumni prizes. It was here she was first involved in Australian artist-run initiatives, initially as co-Director in 1987 (with Adrienne Doig) of ArtHaus laneway gallery in Darlinghurst, New South Wales, then as a member of Ultimo Project Studio Collective in Ultimo and Glebe in Sydney.

In 1995, while completing a Master of Arts in Women's Studies at the University of Wollongong, Rackham became one of the earliest Australian curators of internet art. In collaboration with Louise Manner, Ali Smith and Sandy O’Sullivan, Rackham produced the 1995 exhibition WWWO: Wollongong Worlds Women Online – an Australian online women's group exhibition, featuring the first or early digital works from 30 Australian women including Francis Dyson and Mez Breeze.

In 2000, Rackham's carrier won The Mayne Award for Multimedia, part of the Adelaide Festival Awards for Literature. In an interview with Eugene Thacker in CTheory, Rackham speaks of dealing with the body at a molecular level "infectious agents... steaming open protoplasmic envelopes, penetrating cellular cores, crossing species boundaries, and shattering illusions of the discrete autonomy of ourselves" In a paper analysing carrier for the academic journal Biography, scholar Tully Barnett connects the carrier to posthumanist theories, and describes it as "a biopoiitical web-based work that sets out to destabilize users' traditional or conventional notions of the body." The work is "a text- and image-based multimedia work that invites the reader to navigate through a narrative of infection and illness." Darren Tofts describes carrier as "a work that interprets the body as a navigable zone or space of ethereal strangeness."

Rackham's artworks were widely exhibited during the first wave of internet art (1995–2003) being included in seminal exhibitions like Art Entertainment Network, Beyond Interface, ISEA, European Media Art Festival, transmediale, Perspecta99,  Biennale de Montreal 2000, and Biennial of Buenos Aires 2002.

She is founder and producer the online media arts forum, –empyre–, from 2002 as part of her doctoral thesis on Art and Identity in Virtual Reality Environments. -empyre- featured in events at NTT InterCommunication Center Tokyo, and documenta in the Documenta 12 magazines project (2006).

Building "empyrean" – one of Australia's first multi-user virtual reality environments, Rackham explored the conception of electronically mediated environments as "soft skinned space", and encouraged users' to explore their relationship with their avatars.

Two of Rackham's internet artworks are included in N. Katherine Hayle's Electronic Literature: New Horizons for the Literary – a book designed to help electronic literature move into the classroom along with the CD "The Electronic Literature Collection, Volume 1".

Work 
In April 2003, Rackham was invited to be the inaugural Curator of Networked Media at the Australian Centre for the Moving Image (ACMI) in Melbourne and from 2010 to 2012 was co-curator for Australia's Royal Institution.

She was director of the Australian Network for Art and Technology from 2005 until 2009. She fostered the development of wearable technologies – producing the re:Skin Masterclass, and curating Coded Cloth exhibition of wearable technology at Samstag Museum in 2008.

As an adjunct professor at RMIT University,from 2009 to 2012, Rackham continued to curate and write on the emerging art and cultures manifesting across networked, responsive, biological, wearable and distributed practices and environments. In 2010 she curated "Dream Worlds: Australian Moving Image", platforming artists on the 27 meter long public screen in Beijing's exclusive Sanlitun Village and large screens in Xian, and examined the cultural impact of media arts in China and Hong Kong.

After researching and writing the monograph Catherine Truman: Touching Distance published in 2016, she took a sabbatical and lived part-time over a period of two years on the Anangu Pitjantjatjara Yankunytjatjara (APY) lands of South Australia.

In 2017 Rackham was appointed Adjunct Research Professor at UniSA Creative, University of South Australia, where she continues to investigate and publish on the arts, environment and feminism. In 2019 she completed a suite of essays for Cyberfeminist sheroes VNS Matrix Archive, and is co-authoring with Elvis Richardson, the forthcoming CoUNTess: Spoiling Illusions since 2008 documenting the origins and evolution of CoUNTess and proposing interventions into gender asymmetry in the Australian artworld.

Adoption 

Rackham was an active member of the adoptee advocacy group IDentityRites from 2014 to 2017. She served on the  Steering Committee, which commissioned "The Space Between", a commemorative public artwork in recognition of the long lasting effects of forced adoption practices in South Australia, located in Grundy Gardens along Adelaide's River Torrens, unveiled on 14 July 2016.

With IDentityRites, Rackham co-authored and co-produced a volume of poetry and prose, "ADOPTED", in 2017, and in 2018 she featured in Heather Waters' documentary film on the lifelong effects of adoption, titled You Should be Grateful.

Awards 
 2018 SALA Festival Patron's Art Writer's Award, Australia
 2001 SoundSpace Award for Virtual Environments, Stuttgarter Filmwinter, Germany
 2000 The Mayne Award for Multimedia as part of the Adelaide Festival Awards for Literature
 1999 Gram Internet Art Prize, Argentina

Publications 
 2019 "Essays: VNS Matrix" "Manifesto", "Game Girl", "A Tender Hex", "@go #91010",
 2017 "ADOPTED",
 2016 Catherine Truman: Touching Distance,

References

Further reading 
 Barnett, Tully. "Remediating the Infected Body: Writing the Viral Self in Melinda Rackham's carrier." Biography 35.1 (2012): 45-64.
 Cubitt, Sean. "Melinda Rackham's Online Installations" Artlink: e-volution of new media, Guest Editor: Kathy Cleland, Vol 21 No 3, Australia, September 2001, p24-26.
 Potts, John. Immersed in Soft Space: An Interview with Melinda Rackham Scan : journal of media art cultures, no 14

External links 
 empyre list
 ORCID

1959 births
Living people
20th-century Australian women artists
20th-century Australian artists
21st-century Australian women artists
21st-century Australian artists
Australian digital artists
Women digital artists
New media artists
Australian women curators
Electronic literature writers